Erin Veenstra-Mirabella (born May 18, 1978 in Racine) is an American competitive cyclist. She represented the United States at the 2000 and 2004 Summer Olympics. Mirabella is a six-time national champion. She is coached by her husband Chris Mirabella.

Palmarès

1999
1st Pursuit, Pan American Games, Winnipeg, Canada
1st Points race, Pan American Games, Winnipeg, Canada
1st Pursuit, 1999 UCI Track Cycling World Cup Classics

2002
1st Scratch race, 2002 UCI Track Cycling World Cup Classics, Round 1, Monterrey
1st Pursuit, 2002 UCI Track Cycling World Cup Classics
1st Points race, 2002 UCI Track Cycling World Cup Classics

2003
2nd Pursuit, American National Track Championships
3rd Scratch race, American National Track Championships
2nd Pursuit, 2004 UCI Track Cycling World Cup Classics, Round 2, Aguascalientes

2004
4th Points race, Olympic Games
1st Points race, 2004 UCI Track Cycling World Cup Classics, Round 2, Aguascalientes
3rd Points race, 2004–2005 UCI Track Cycling World Cup Classics, Round 2, Los Angeles

2005
1st Points race, Pan American Championships
3rd Pursuit, Pan American Championships

Books
Mirabella has used her experiences as an Olympic athlete to write a series of children's books,  The Barnsville Sports Squad Series.
Gracie Goat's Big Bike Race, VeloPress,  (June 10, 2007), illustrated by Lisa Horstman
Shawn Sheep The Soccer Star, VeloPress,  (July 28, 2008), illustrated by Sarah Davis

References

External links
 
 
 
 
 

1978 births
Living people
American female cyclists
American cycling coaches
American children's writers
Cyclists at the 1999 Pan American Games
Cyclists at the 2000 Summer Olympics
Cyclists at the 2004 Summer Olympics
Olympic cyclists of the United States
Sportspeople from Racine, Wisconsin
Cyclists from Wisconsin
Writers from Wisconsin
Pan American Games medalists in cycling
Pan American Games gold medalists for the United States
Pan American Games silver medalists for the United States
21st-century American women
Medalists at the 1999 Pan American Games